"Right Now" is a song by Futurasound with vocals by Shara Nelson released as a single in 2003.

Track listing

CD Single

 Right Now (Youth Mix) 6:26
 Right Now (DJ MP aka Piraz Mix) 4:16
 Right Now (Original Mix) 5:01

References

External links

2003 singles
Shara Nelson songs
2003 songs